Sinéad Ennis is a Sinn Féin politician, elected to the Northern Ireland Assembly for the South Down constituency in the March 2017 elections.

She is married and has two daughters. She has played Gaelic games at club level with Burren GAA. She was previously a member of Newry, Mourne and Down District Council from 2013 to 2017.

References

External links
 
 Official profile at Sinn Féin's website

Year of birth missing (living people)
Living people
Place of birth missing (living people)
Sinn Féin MLAs
Northern Ireland MLAs 2017–2022
Female members of the Northern Ireland Assembly
Sinn Féin councillors in Northern Ireland
Northern Ireland MLAs 2022–2027